is a Japanese triple jumper. He competed at the 2016 Summer Olympics in the men's triple jump event; his result of 15.71 meters in the qualifying round did not qualify him for the final.

References

External links 
 
 
 
 

1994 births
Living people
Japanese male triple jumpers
Olympic male triple jumpers
Olympic athletes of Japan
Athletes (track and field) at the 2016 Summer Olympics
Asian Games competitors for Japan
Athletes (track and field) at the 2018 Asian Games
Japan Championships in Athletics winners